The FIA WTCC Race of Slovakia, currently the FIA WTCR Race of Slovakia, is a former round of the World Touring Car Championship, currently of the World Touring Car Cup, held at the Automotodróm Slovakia Ring, in the village of Orechová Potôň, Slovakia,  away from the capital city of Bratislava.

The race made its debut in the World Touring Car Championship as the fourth round of the 2012 season and as a replacement for the proposed Argentinian round.

The race was held for another four consecutive years, until 2016, not being included in the 2017 season calendar of the series.

It returned however as a round of the inaugural World Touring Car Cup season in 2018, as a replacement for the cancelled Argentina round.

Winners

References

 
Slovakia
Slovakia
Sport in Bratislava
Motorsport competitions in Slovakia
Recurring sporting events established in 2012
2012 establishments in Slovakia